Hässleholms IF is a Swedish football club located in Hässleholm in Skåne County.

Background
Hässleholms Idrottsförening were founded on 1 May 1922.  In addition to football, the club over the years has run sections covering wrestling, table tennis, handball, bandy and ice hockey. HIF also has a basketball section with youth teams for boys and girls.  Later the club has added a section for those with disabilities. For several years HIF had great success in youth football reflecting the development of this section of the club.

Since their foundation Hässleholms IF has participated mainly in the middle and lower divisions of the Swedish football league system.  The club currently plays in Division 2 Södra Götaland which is the fourth tier of Swedish football. They play their home matches at the Österås IP in Hässleholm.

Hässleholms IF are affiliated to Skånes Fotbollförbund.  Local rivals IFK Hässleholm play in the same division.

Recent history
In recent seasons Hässleholms IF have competed in the following divisions:

2020 – Division 2 Östra Götaland
2019 – Division 2 Östra Götaland
2018 – Division 2 Östra Götaland
2017 – Division 2 Östra Götaland
2016 – Division 2 Södra Götaland 
2015 – Division 2 Södra Götaland
2014 – Division 2 Södra Götaland
2013 – Division 2 Södra Götaland
2012 – Division 3 Sydöstra Götaland
2011 – Division 3 Sydvästra Götaland
2010 – Division 4 Skåne Östra
2009 – Division 4 Skåne Norra
2008 – Division 3 Södra Götaland
2007 – Division 4 Skåne Norra
2006 – Division 4 Skåne Norra
2005 – Division 5 Skåne Mellersta
2004 – Division 5 Skåne Nordöstra
2003 – Division 5 Skåne Nordöstra
2002 – Division 5 Skåne Nordöstra
2001 – Division 4 Skåne Östra
2000 – Division 4 Skåne Norra
1999 – Division 4 Skåne Norra

Squad

Hässleholms IF 2018 Squad:

Footnotes

External links
 Hässleholms IF – Official website
 Hässleholms IF on Facebook

Sport in Skåne County
Football clubs in Skåne County
Association football clubs established in 1922
1922 establishments in Sweden